Shahrak-e Gabrik (also Romanized as Shahrak-e Gābrīk; also known as Gabrīg and Gābrīk) is a village in Gabrik Rural District, in the Central District of Jask County, Hormozgan Province, Iran. At the 2006 census, its population was 18, in 6 families.

References 

Populated places in Jask County